Captain Sidney Richard Olivier CMG (1 March 1870 – 21 January 1932) was an English cricketer.  Olivier's batting style is unknown, though it is known he fielded as a wicket-keeper.  He was born at Wilton, Wiltshire.

Naval career

Cricket career
Olivier made a single first-class appearance for Hampshire against Leicestershire at the United Services Recreation Ground, Portsmouth, in the 1895 County Championship. Standing in for regular wicket-keeper Charles Robson, Olivier batted once in the match and was run out for a duck in Hampshire's first-innings of 152 all out, made in response to Leicestershire's 212 all out in their first-innings, during which Olivier took two catches from behind the stumps.  Leicestershire made 117 in their second-innings, with Olivier taking a single catch in it.  This left Hampshire with a target of 177 for victory, which they chased down to win by three wickets.  Olivier was not required to bat in Hampshire's chase, with this match being his only major appearance for the county.

Death
He died at Horton, Dorset, on 21 January 1932.  His uncle, Frederick Morton Eden, and brother-in-law, Lionel Collins, both played first-class cricket.

References

External links
Sidney Olivier at ESPNcricinfo
Sidney Olivier at CricketArchive

1870 births
1932 deaths
People from Wilton, Wiltshire
English cricketers
Hampshire cricketers
Royal Navy officers
Companions of the Order of St Michael and St George
Wicket-keepers
Military personnel from Wiltshire